1095 Tulipa is an Eos asteroid from the outer regions of the asteroid belt. It was discovered by German astronomer Karl Reinmuth at the Heidelberg-Königstuhl State Observatory in southwest Germany on 14 April 1926. It was named after the flower Tulip (lat. Tulipa). Originally, the name was redundantly assigned to Florian asteroid 1449 Virtanen.

Orbit and classification 

Tulipa is a member the Eos family, the largest asteroid family of the outer main belt consisting of nearly 10,000 known asteroids. It orbits the Sun at a distance of 3.0–3.1 AU once every 5 years and 3 months (1,922 days). Its orbit has an eccentricity of 0.02 and an inclination of 10° with respect to the ecliptic.

The asteroid was first observed at Heidelberg on the night of its official discovery.

Etymology 

This minor planet was named after the Tulip (lat. Tulipa), a genus of spring-blooming showy flowers of the Liliaceae (lily family). The official naming citation was mentioned in The Names of the Minor Planets by Paul Herget in 1955.

Reinmuth's flower 

Karl Reinmuth submitted a list of 66 newly named asteroids in the early 1930s. This list also contained a sequence of 28 asteroids, starting with 1054 Forsytia, that were all named after plants, in particular flowering plants (also see list of minor planets named after animals and plants).

Physical characteristics 

Tulipa is an assumed stony S-type, while the Eoan family's overall spectral type is that of a K-type.

Rotation period 

A large number of rotational lightcurves of Tulipa have been obtained from photometric observations since 1983. Analysis of the best-rated lightcurve by Pierre Antonini, Raoul Behrend and Gino Farroni in May 2005, gave a rotation period of 2.78721 hours with a consolidated brightness variation of 0.23 magnitude.

Poles 

Photometric data gathered with the 60-centimeter BlueEye600 robotic observatory near the Ondřejov Observatory in the Czech Republic, were used to model a lightcurve with a concurring period of 2.787153 hours and two spin axis of (142.0°, 40.0°) and (349.0°, 56.0°) in ecliptic coordinates (λ, β).

Diameter and albedo 

According to the surveys carried out by the Infrared Astronomical Satellite IRAS, the Japanese Akari satellite and the NEOWISE mission of NASA's Wide-field Infrared Survey Explorer, Tulipa measures between 27.875 and 31.52 kilometers in diameter  and its surface has an albedo between 0.1208 and 0.1544. The Collaborative Asteroid Lightcurve Link derives an albedo of 0.1229 and  a diameter of 31.53 kilometers based on an absolute magnitude of 10.40.

Notes

References

External links 
 Lightcurve Database Query (LCDB), at www.minorplanet.info
 Dictionary of Minor Planet Names, Google books
 Asteroids and comets rotation curves, CdR – Geneva Observatory, Raoul Behrend
 Discovery Circumstances: Numbered Minor Planets (1)-(5000) – Minor Planet Center
 
 

001095
Discoveries by Karl Wilhelm Reinmuth
Named minor planets
19260414